The Miss Ecuador 1985 was held on June 4, 1985. There were 15 candidates for the national title. In the end of the night, Patricía Gonzembach Vallejo from Guayas crowned to María Elena Stangl Tamayo from Guayas as Miss Ecuador 1985. The Miss Ecuador competed at Miss Universe 1985.

Results

Placements

Special awards

Contestants

Notes

Returns

Last compete in:

1983
 Chimborazo
 El Oro

Withdrawals
 Azuay
 Loja
 Los Ríos

External links

Official Miss Ecuador website

1985 beauty pageants
Beauty pageants in Ecuador
Miss Ecuador